Lento (transl. Flight) is the second album by Finnish acoustic rock band Harmaja. It was released on 21 April 2010 in Finland through Wiima.

Track listing

 Alkusoitto (transl. Intro)
 Viipyvä virta (transl. Delaying Stream)
 Hauras (transl. Fragile)
 Pelkkä ihminen (transl. Only Human)
 Kuuletko (transl. Do You Hear)
 Liian pimeä (transl. Too Dark)
 Murheenlaulaja (trans. Singer of Sorrow)
 Palasia (transl. Pieces)
 Veli (transl. Brother)
 Ei viha (transl. Not Hate)
 Kuinka me voimme (trans. How We Feel)
 Loppusoitto (transl. Outro)

Personnel
 Juha-Pekka Leppäluoto — lead vocals, guitar, Rhodes
 Sami Lauttanen — guitar
 Simo Vuorela — guitar
 Matti "Joki-Matti" Tulinen — bass
 Paula Präktig — piano, vocals, Rhodes
 Riku Kovalainen — drums

2010 albums